Minipera is a genus of ascidian tunicates in the family Molgulidae.

Species within the genus Minipera include:
 Minipera macquariensis Sanamyan & Sanamyan, 1999 
 Minipera papillosa Monniot C. & Monniot F., 1974 
 Minipera pedunculata Monniot C. & Monniot F., 1974 
 Minipera tacita Monniot & Monniot, 1985

References

Stolidobranchia
Tunicate genera